Hannibal is the surname of:

 Abram Petrovich Gannibal or Hannibal (1697–1781), African prince and Russian general
 Ivan Gannibal (1735–1801), Russian general and Abram's son
 Heinrich Hannibal (1889–1971), German World War II SS officer
 Robin Hannibal, Danish and musician and record producer
 Dr. Hannibal, the professional wrestling persona of Steven Gillespie